Fu Ying (born January 1953) is a Chinese politician and diplomat, best known for her terms as the ambassador to the Philippines, Australia, and the United Kingdom, as well as Vice Minister of Foreign Affairs. She currently serves as the chairperson of the National People's Congress Foreign Affairs Committee.

An ethnic Mongol born in Hohhot, Inner Mongolia, Fu Ying is the first woman, and the only ethnic minority woman, to serve as Vice-Minister of Foreign Affairs since 1979, and one of only two to serve in Chinese history. Fu graduated from the Beijing Foreign Studies University. In 1976, she became the official interpreter of the diplomatic service.

She led the Chinese Delegation during talks with North Korea that led to the latter country's decision (later reneged on) to abandon nuclear weapons. From 2004 to 2007 she was the ambassador to Australia. She was the Chinese ambassador to the United Kingdom from March 2007 to 2009.  In February 2010 she returned to China and was replaced by Liu Xiaoming.

Early life
Fu was born in Hohhot, Inner Mongolia, in 1953. Her father was a student of Ai Siqi and she is of Mongol descent.

Education
She graduated from the Beijing Foreign Studies University. In 1985, she did an MA in International Relations at the University of Kent. She also was given an honorary Doctorate of Civil Law in 2008 by the University of Kent.

Career

 1978–1982 Attaché, Embassy in Romania
 1982–1985 Attaché, Department of Translation and Interpretation, Ministry of Foreign Affairs
 1985–1986 University of Kent
 1986–1990 Third Secretary, Second Secretary and Deputy Director, the Department of Translation and Interpretation, Ministry of Foreign Affairs
 1990–1992 Deputy Director and First Secretary, the Department of Asian Affairs, Ministry of Foreign Affairs
 1992–1993 Staff Member, United Nations Transitional Authority in Cambodia
 1993–1997 First Secretary, Director and Counsellor, Department of Asian Affairs, Ministry of Foreign Affairs
 1997–1998 Minister Counsellor, Embassy in Indonesia
 1998–2000 Ambassador to the Philippines
 2000–2003 Director-General, Department of Asian Affairs, Ministry of Foreign Affairs
 2003–2007 Ambassador to Australia
 Mar 2007–2010 Ambassador to the United Kingdom
 2009–2013 Vice Foreign Minister of PRC
 2013–2017 Chairperson of the Foreign Affairs Committee of China's 12th National People's Congress
 2017–2019 Vice Chair of the Foreign Affairs Committee of China's 13th National People's Congress
 2019 Honorary Dean of Institute of International Relations and Chairman of Center for International Strategy and Security of Tsinghua University

A 2019 Report by the Hoover Institution of Stanford University stated that Fu Ying is the "senior figure in a growing number of US–China interactions," especially with U.S. think tanks.

Personal life
Fu Ying tries to adhere to elements of traditional Inner Mongolian culture in her personal life. She drinks suutei tsai (Hohhot-style milk tea) on the weekends, listens to the traditional Mongol long song, and eats Inner Mongolian food. She has one daughter by her husband, ethnologist Hao Shiyuan.

References

External links
Brief news article re: Chen Yonglin
Chinese Embassy in the UK
 Fu Ying  Video produced by Makers: Women Who Make America

1953 births
Living people
Alumni of the University of Kent
Beijing Foreign Studies University alumni
Ambassadors of China to Australia
Ambassadors of China to the Philippines
Ambassadors of China to the United Kingdom
Chinese people of Mongolian descent
Chinese women ambassadors
Chinese women diplomats
Members of the Standing Committee of the 13th National People's Congress
People from Hohhot